Cowboy is a 1966 American short documentary film directed by Michael Ahnemann and produced by Ahnemann and Gary Schlosser. It was nominated for an Academy Award for Best Documentary Short.

See also
List of American films of 1966

References

External links

Cowboy at the National Archives and Records Administration

1966 films
1966 documentary films
1966 short films
1966 independent films
American short documentary films
American independent films
1960s short documentary films
United States Information Agency films
1960s English-language films
1960s American films